The Circle (original title: Cirkeln) is a Swedish fantasy film produced and scored by Benny Andersson and directed and co-written by Levan Akin, based on the best-selling novel The Circle by Sara Bergmark Elfgren and Mats Strandberg. It was intended to be the first in an trilogy of films based on Engelsfors, though plans of the sequels have been cancelled. A film adaptation was to be produced by Filmlance in 2013, with Levan Akin set to direct and Bergmark Elfgren as script writer. The production was put on hold due to disagreements between the authors and Filmlance. Akin left the project as well. Benny Andersson's son Ludvig brought the novel to his attention and he bought the rights to produce the film, more faithfully than Filmlance intended, however the film still has significant differences from the original novel. Open castings for young girls who could play the leads were held all over Sweden.

The film was screened at the 2015 Berlin International Film Festival, and it was released in Swedish cinemas on 18 February 2015.

Plot
The film follows Rebecka, Minoo, Vanessa, Anna-Karin, Ida and Linnea, all of whom are first-year students at the same secondary school. The apparent suicide of Linnea's best friend Elias becomes the start for a series of strange events in the town, as the 6 girls discover they are witches chosen to save the world.

Cast

Josefin Asplund as Rebecka
Helena Engström as Anna-Karin Nieminen
 as Vanessa
 as Minoo
Ruth Vega Fernandez as Adriana Lopez
Leona Axelsen as Linnéa
Sverrir Gudnason as Max
Hanna Asp as Ida
Gustav Lindh as Elias 
Charlie Petersson as Willie 
 as Nicke
 as Mia Niemine
 as Taisto Nieminen
 as Vincent Grahl
 as Kevin
Per Svensson as Falk
 as Matilda

Production
The film was shot in Södertälje, Lidingö and Vuollerim.

Soundtrack

The score of the film was produced and composed by Benny Andersson, with his son Ludvig Andersson providing additional music and serving as music supervisor. The film includes music by Anna von Hausswolff, Fever Ray, Daughter, Style of Eye and new music by The Hives. Kate Bush's Running Up That Hill is used prominently in the film and She Will by Savages from the album Silence Yourself is played over the closing credits. Benny Andersson secured the rights to use Running Up That Hill by promising Kate Bush's manager to repay the favour by performing as a pianist if she needed one. Originally Andersson wanted Karin Dreijer Andersson to compose the score.

Reception
After the Berlin Film Festival screening, Screen International wrote about The Circle that it was "emotionally literate" and that the characters had "an unexpected degree of depth". The Hollywood Reporter stated that the script did not develop the characters properly and that it felt like parts of a TV-series where everybody knew everything about the characters and that the actors were not allowed to do much with their characters. It was met with mostly positive reviews from Swedish critics. Due to poor box office, the planned sequels were cancelled and Akin started work on And Then We Danced instead.

References

External links
 

Films based on Swedish novels
Swedish fantasy films
2015 films
Films about bullying
2010s teen fantasy films
Films about witchcraft
Films based on young adult literature
2010s Swedish-language films
2010s Swedish films